Devona may refer to:
 Devona (Night Watch), a term from the Russian novel.
 Devona or Divona, a Celtic river goddess.
 Devona, Roman name for the river Don, Scotland.